All Saints' Church is a historic Carpenter Gothic style Episcopal church at Easton, Talbot County, Maryland, United States. It is a small rectangular frame church constructed in 1900–1901.  The exterior features of the church include a three-stage bell tower with a shingled spire. The interior features imported stained glass windows from Munich, Germany, along with decorative tile floors, a darkly stained exposed timber roof structure, and intricately carved church furniture. The church was designed by New York architect, Henry Martyn Congdon.

All Saints' Church was listed on the National Register of Historic Places in 1983.

References

External links
, including photo from 1970, at Maryland Historical Trust

Churches in Talbot County, Maryland
Easton, Maryland
Churches on the National Register of Historic Places in Maryland
Episcopal church buildings in Maryland
Carpenter Gothic church buildings in Maryland
Churches completed in 1900
19th-century Episcopal church buildings
National Register of Historic Places in Talbot County, Maryland